Conversations with a Killer: The John Wayne Gacy Tapes is a limited docuseries created and directed by Joe Berlinger for Netflix. It is the second installment in the Conversations with a Killer series and succeeds Conversations with a Killer: The Ted Bundy Tapes. The series depicts the murder spree of serial killer John Wayne Gacy, who killed at least 33 teenage boys and young men between 1972 and 1978 in Chicago, Illinois. The story is depicted through never-before-heard archival audio footage that was recorded during Gacy's incarceration, interviews with participants close to the case and from one of the surviving victims. It was released on April 20, 2022.

Reception
On Rotten Tomatoes, a review aggregator, the show holds an approval rating of 83%, based on 5 votes.

See also
 Limited-run series 
 To Catch a Killer

References

External links

 Buried Dreams: Inside the Mind of a Serial Killer

2022 American television series debuts
2022 American television series endings
2020s American documentary television series
Documentary television series about crime in the United States
English-language Netflix original programming
Netflix original documentary television series
Television series created by Joe Berlinger
Cultural depictions of John Wayne Gacy